Rashmi Varma is an Indian politician from BJP. She has represented Narkatiaganj in the Bihar Legislative Assembly since 25 August 2014. She won the 2014 by-elections from Narkatiaganj of Bihar. She was former Mayor of Narkatiaganj. She won the 2020 elections from Narkatiaganj by defeating Vinay Verma contesting from INC.

Threats and controversy 
Varma was threatened to not contest the elections through a letter outside her house. It was pointed out that her children won't be safe if she would contest the election. Rashmi Varma, right after being elected, was threatened via a phone call to be killed if she won't pay a ransom of INR 25,00,000 for her own life. However, the person threatening was arrested with the help of local police and administration.

References

Living people
People from West Champaran district
Women members of the Bihar Legislative Assembly
Bihar MLAs 2010–2015
Bharatiya Janata Party politicians from Bihar
21st-century Indian women politicians
21st-century Indian politicians
Bihar MLAs 2020–2025
1967 births